Poemss is the debut studio album by Poemss. Poemss is a musical project from Toronto-based producer and music artist Joanne Pollock in collaboration with Aaron Funk, who is best known for recording music as Venetian Snares. After initially meeting each other in Europe, Joanne visited Aaron at his studio and played her music for him. A collaboration between the two happened soon after. 'Poemss' was released in February 2014 under Planet Mu Records.

Track list

References

2014 albums
Planet Mu albums